Callimation apicale is a species of beetle in the family Cerambycidae. It was described by Per Olof Christopher Aurivillius in 1908 and is known from Malawi.

References

Tragocephalini
Beetles described in 1908